In mathematics,  two elements x and y of a set P are said to be comparable with respect to a binary relation ≤ if at least one of x ≤ y or y ≤ x is true.  They are called incomparable if they are not comparable.

Rigorous definition 

Example 

A totally ordered set is a partially ordered set in which any two elements are comparable. The Szpilrajn extension theorem states that every partial order is contained in a total order. Intuitively, the theorem says that any method of comparing elements that leaves some pairs incomparable can be extended in such a way that every pair becomes comparable.

Properties 

Comparability graphs 

Classification 

When classifying mathematical objects (e.g., topological spaces), two  are said to be comparable when the objects that obey one criterion constitute a subset of the objects that obey the other, which is to say when they are comparable under the partial order ⊂. For example, the T1 and T2 criteria are comparable, while the T1 and sobriety criteria are not.

See also 
 , a partial ordering in which incomparability is a transitive relation

References

External links

 

Binary relations
Order theory